A.D. Splivalo was a member of the California legislature and was born in Chile.

References

Members of the California State Legislature